Manju Bharti is an Indian actress, producer, director and model who has produced many films including Kaash Tum Hote, Mausam Ikrar Ke Do Pal Pyar Ke, Ek adhura sangeet. She is known for portraying Simran in Kaash Tum Hote.

Early life
Born on 21 March 1983, Manju finished her schooling from Swami Vivekananda High School, Chembur and earned a Bachelor's in Commerce degree from Mumbai University in 2003.

Career
In 2012, Manju launched her own production house "Vivek Films Production House". She made her acting debut with the 2014 film Kaash Tum Hote playing as Simran. She went on to star in the 2018 film Mausam Ikrar Ke Do Pal Pyar Ke which is directed by Partho Ghosh and produced by Manju herself, its songs have been composed by Bappi Lahiri, Indian singer and sung by Bappi Lahiri, Armaan Malik, Palak Muchhal, Shaan, Brijesh Shandilya, Amruta Fadnavis, and Babul Supriyo.

In 2020, Manju received the Midday Showbiz Icon Award 2020 held at the Grand Hyatt, Mumbai.

Filmography

References

External links
 

Living people
1983 births
Indian actresses
20th-century Indian actresses
21st-century Indian actresses
People from Mumbai
Indian film actresses
Female models from Mumbai